Dale André Martin (in Hungarian: Martin Dale András) born in 1957, is an Austrian-Hungarian businessman. He was president and CEO of Siemens Zrt. from 2010 until 2021. Since his retirement from Siemens, he has taken up the role of President of the European Engineering Learning Innovation and Science Alliance (EELISA).

Education
He attended the Theresianum and Kalksburg College high schools in Vienna, and completed his Master's in social and economic studies at the Vienna University of Economics and Business. He also studied Mandarin at the National Taiwan Normal University.

Career

Other Activities

Honours and awards

References 

Hungarian businesspeople
Austrian businesspeople
Siemens people
1957 births
Living people
Commander's Crosses of the Order of Merit of the Republic of Hungary (civil)
Officer's Crosses of the Order of Merit of the Republic of Hungary (civil)
Recipients of the Grand Decoration for Services to the Republic of Austria
Vienna University of Economics and Business alumni
Recipients of the Cross of the Order of Merit of the Federal Republic of Germany